Dyschirius haemorrhoidalis is a species of ground beetle in the subfamily Scaritinae. It was described by Pierre François Marie Auguste Dejean in 1831.

References

haemorrhoidalis
Beetles described in 1831